Titus Numicius Priscus was a Roman politician active in the fifth century BC and was consul in 469 BC.

Family

The Numicii were a plebeian family in Rome. He was the only member of the family to achieve the consulship. Diodorus Siculus gave him the name "Minucius" in the place of "Numicius".

Biography
In 469 BC, he was elected consul with Aulus Verginius Caeliomontanus as his colleague. Numicius was given responsibility for leading an army against the Volsci, after they had invaded Roman territory and began burning Roman country estates.  The Volscian forces left the Roman territory, but Numicius pursued them, defeated the Volscian army in an initial engagement, then when the Volscian forces took shelter in Antium, Numicius captured the neighbouring port town of Ceno. He made inventory of their livestock, slaves, and other goods like plunder. Priscus then regrouped with Tricostus to plunder the Sabine country in reprisal for a raid by the Sabines in Roman territory.

Notes

Bibliography

Primary sources
 Dionysius of Halicarnassus, Roman Antiquities, Book IX
 Livy, The History of Rome, Book II

Secondary sources
 

5th-century BC Roman consuls